The Lynn Vocational Technical Institute (a.k.a. LVTI, Lynn Tech), is a vocational and technical high school located in Lynn, Massachusetts, United States and is part of the Lynn Public Schools district. LVTI offers a wide variety of trades, referred to as shops, and academic classes. Currently, Carissa Karakaedos holds the position of the school's principal; Emily Spinucci and Fred Gallo share the vice principal position.

History
In 1948, Lynn's newly designated third secondary school, at the time referred to as the Lynn Vocational High School, held its first graduation ceremony, at which a class of 70 seniors were awarded diplomas by Mayor Stuart A. Tarr. Ralph W. Babb was the school's first principal, and he would remain principal until his retirement in 1950.

Michael C. O'Donnell would then hold the principal/director spot until 1971, when he retired as well.

In 1953, during that year's graduation ceremony, it was announced that the school would rename itself to "Lynn Trade High". This rename would be effective immediately upon its announcement, and the 37-member graduating class of '53 would be its first under the new name.

In 1971, Lynn Trade High relocated to 80 Neptune Boulevard, hired James A. Pelley as its new principal, and renamed itself once again, this time to its current name.

The first two graduation commencement exercises, 1948/49,  were held in the Classical High School auditorium; in 1950 they were held at the E. J. Harrington School's auditorium until 1971; the first graduation program at the new Lynn Vocational Technical Institute was conducted in 1972 when diplomas were presented to 104 graduates in the school cafetorium.

References

Commonwealth Athletic Conference
Educational institutions established in 1948
Public high schools in Massachusetts
Schools in Lynn, Massachusetts
1948 establishments in Massachusetts